Siaman (also Romanized as Sīāmān and Seyāmān; also known as Sīāhmān and Siakhman) is a village in Sojas Rud Rural District, Sojas Rud District, Khodabandeh County, Zanjan Province, Iran. At the 2006 census, its population was 190, in 44 families.

References 

Populated places in Khodabandeh County